Door, Door is the debut album by Australian rock band The Boys Next Door. The album was recorded before the band left Australia for London in 1980, at which point they changed their name to The Birthday Party and created the body of work for which they are most recognised. Likewise, the album is different stylistically from their later work, being less dark and slightly more poppy.

Background 
The band recorded a full album in June 1978 as a four-piece. Shortly afterwards, Rowland S. Howard joined as second guitarist and the group discarded half of these songs and recorded five new tracks in January 1979. These were featured on side two of the released LP (tracks 6-10 of the CD release). Of the "missing" half-album, only a demo of the song "Sex Crimes" has ever been released (in 2005).

Legacy 
Vocalist Nick Cave later said of the album, "We were adolescents and very late developers. There was a period where we were confused and had a lot of problems and we put out an album like Door, Door which is a product of all those things. I mean, it was a complete wet dream that record. I hate it. It reeks of a band trying to be musically intelligent and write clever, witty lyrics. It's a complete wank".

The album includes the single "Shivers" which became their best known song. Written by Howard, "Shivers" was later covered by Marie Hoy, The Screaming Jets, Divine Fits, Courtney Barnett, and others. "Shivers" was also included on the soundtrack of the 1986 film Dogs in Space, both the original Door Door version and Marie Hoy's cover.

Track listing
 "The Nightwatchman" – 2:07
 "Brave Exhibitions" – 2:27
 "Friends of my World" – 2:46
 "The Voice" – 3:55
 "Roman Roman" – 1:35
 "Somebody's Watching" – 2:39
 "After a Fashion" – 4:36
 "Dive Position" – 2:47
 "I Mistake Myself" – 4:31
 "Shivers" – 4:34

All songs credited to The Boys Next Door.

Charts

Band personnel
Nick Cave - vocals
Mick Harvey - guitar (1-7), piano (8-10)
Rowland S. Howard - guitar (7-10)
Tracy Pew - bass guitar
Phill Calvert - drums

Additional personnel 
Tony Cohen - engineer
Chris Coyne - tenor sax
Henry Vyhnal - violin
Andrew Duffield - electronics

References

External links
The Birthday Party lyrics from Nick Cave Online

The Birthday Party (band) albums
1979 debut albums
Mushroom Records albums